The Children's Society, formally the Church of England Children's Society, is a United Kingdom national children's charity (registered No. 221124) allied to the Church of England.

The charity's two governing objectives are to:

 directly improve the lives of children and young people for whom it provides services
 create a positive shift in social attitudes to improve the situation facing all children and young people.

History
The Children's Society was founded in the late nineteenth century by Edward Rudolf, a Sunday School teacher and civil servant in South London. Rudolf led a deputation to Archibald Tait, Archbishop of Canterbury to put forward a plan for the establishment of Church of England children's homes as an alternative to the large workhouses and orphanages common at that time. In 1881, a new organisation was registered as the Church of England Central Home for Waifs and Strays, taking the name Church of England Incorporated Society for Providing Homes for Waifs and Strays in 1893. It kept this name until 1946, when the title was changed to the Church of England Children's Society and adopted the informal title of The Children's Society in 1982.

The first home was opened in Dulwich in 1882. Its success, together with a growing awareness of the scale of child poverty in England and Wales, led to the rapid development of The Children's Society. It moved to new offices at the Old Town Hall in Kennington Road in 1909. By 1919 the charity had 113 homes and cared for 5,000 children.

A main feature of The Children's Society's work was its insistence that children should not become long-term residents in homes, but boarded out, fostered or adopted. By the late 1960s The Children's Society had become one of the largest adoption agencies in the country.

In the late 1960s and the early 1970s, in response to the significant social changes of these years, The Children's Society moved away from centralised care, fostering and adoption work and focused more on preventative work designed to support children and young people within their own families and communities. During the 1970s and 1980s The Children's Society introduced family centres throughout the country offering services such as advice centres, play groups, youth clubs and short term accommodation for young, single children. The society relocated from the Old Town Hall in Kennington Road to new offices at Kings Cross in 1986.

During the 1990s The Children's Society began focusing on social justice, lobbying to change legislation and welfare provision, and encouraging young people to speak and act for themselves.

The charity's direct practice now focuses on vulnerable children and young people aged 10 to 18 - including children who have been sexually exploited, children in care and young refugees. Its policy and campaigning work is informed by its direct practice, and by its extensive research on children's well-being, child poverty and adolescent neglect.

The Children's Society was rebranded in 2014 by London-based design practice SomeOne from a logo depicting a purple figure reaching for a star to the current black and white identity. The new look reflects the charity's belief of confronting 'hard truths'.

In 2017, The Children’s Society launched a new strategy aimed at disrupting the cycles of disadvantage that prevent young people from thriving by 2030; an ambition that directly supports the vision and mission. The charity has chosen to concentrate on young people aged 10–18 with many problems in their lives (or multiple disadvantage). The strategy focuses on using innovation to scale up impact through technology and learning, partnerships to leverage resource, and continuous improvement by becoming an agile and efficient organisation.

As well as supporting change at an individual level through its direct programmes of work, The Children's Society aims to effect systemic change by influencing legislation and government practice, and to effect a positive shift in public attitudes towards children and young people.

The Children's Society's strategy explores the complex challenges in young people's lives by focusing on three areas: risk, resilience and resources.

 Risk: The threats and dangers to a young person's safety which could include neglect and abuse, exploitation and violence.
 Resilience: A young person's capacity to respond to adversity at any given time which could include mental health or trauma.
 Resources: The resources available to meet a young person's needs which could include family support, money or social support.

Finances
The charity's income in 2017-18 was £38.4m. This was largely voluntary income donated by supporters (£17.4m). A further £9.95m was generated by the provision of children's services and £10.82m from charity shops. Investments and other income contributed an additional £0.24m.

Activities

The Good Childhood Inquiry and Report
The Children's Society is known for its research into children's well-being. It seeks to provide the a national picture on how children feel about their lives by asking children themselves. Over the last 12 years the charity has surveyed over 60,000 children as to how they think their lives are going.

In 2006 the charity commissioned an independent inquiry into modern childhood called The Good Childhood Inquiry. The rationale behind the inquiry was that, despite the 2003 Every Child Matters programme, unacceptable levels of disadvantage, poverty and social exclusion remained.

The Inquiry's report, A Good Childhood: Searching for Values in a Competitive Age, was published in 2009. It found that 'excessive individualism' is causing a range of problems for children today, including family break-up, teenage unkindness, unprincipled advertising, too much competition in education and acceptance of income inequality.

The charity went on to develop the Good Childhood Index in 2010 to provide a measure of subjective well-being in relation to 10 aspects of life for children over the age of eight. It surveys children on topics including their appearance, school life and family relationships among others.

Each year The Children's Society produces a report based on the index in partnership with the University of York called The Good Childhood Report.

This data are used by the Office for National Statistics' Measuring National Well-being Programme as the life satisfaction measure of personal well-being for children.

The 2016 Good Childhood Report showed "a growing gap in happiness between girls and boys, with girls being particularly unhappy with their appearance". The Good Childhood Report 2017 found that fear of crime is the biggest worry for children and young people. In 2019, The Good Childhood Report reported that children's well-being had fallen to a 10-year low.

Campaigns
The Children's Society campaigns for changes to laws and policy that affect children.

For example, its work with young people on the streets culminated in a study in 1999, which called for a nationwide network of safe houses to be set up, and for statutory money to pay for them. This work also fed into a campaign to decriminalise prostitution for under-18s. The charity argued that child prostitution should be seen as a child protection issue, and that police and other agencies should protect children and young people from exploitation. In 1995, The Children's Society published the first report to highlight child prostitution in this way and the Association of Chief Police Officers and the Association of Directors of Social Services responded by making a public commitment to review the way they dealt with these children.

Christingle

Christingle services were popularised in the United Kingdom by John Pensom of the Children's Society. Since 1968 Christingle services have been held by churches and schools to raise funds for the society's work. £1.2m was raised in 2013 from over 5,000 events.

Historic abuse scandal
In June 2017, prompted by scrutiny from the Independent Inquiry into Child Sexual Abuse (IICSA) into its past conduct, the Children's Society admitted to its role in historic child abuse. The charity was implicated in abuse arising from its role in facilitating the migration of 3700 children to Australia, Canada and Rhodesia (Zimbabwe)
.  The charity also issued an apology for abuse carried out in its children's homes in the United Kingdom; "We also want to acknowledge that it’s not only child migrants who suffered at the hands of abusers. We are also deeply sorry to any other people who in the past suffered neglect, harm or sexual abuse while in the care of The Children’s Society here in the UK..."

The charity had been aware of the abuse for many years, and had paid damages in secret to victims, only admitting to these payments in 2017 following scrutiny from IICSA.

References

External links
The Children's Society
Hidden Lives Revealed  A Virtual Archive — Children in Care 1881–1918
The Children's Homes website A history of the Children's Society with details of each home it ran
Children's Society Paid Damages to Victims of Sexual Abuse, The Telegraph
IICSA, Child Migration Programmes Investigation Report

Charities based in London
Children's charities based in England
Church of England societies and organisations
1881 establishments in England
Organisations based in the London Borough of Islington
Organizations established in 1881
Religion in the London Borough of Islington